Bodda Pratyusha (born 1997 in Tuni, East Godavari, Andhra Pradesh) is an Indian chess player. In 2012, she was the Indian girls' under-17 champion. In April 2015, she earned the Woman International Master (WIM) title.

In 2020, she became the third Telugu woman to earn the Woman Grandmaster (WGM) title, after Koneru Humpy (2001) and Dronavalli Harika (2004). As of March 2020, her FIDE standard rating is 2328.

Personal life 
Pratyusha did her schooling at Sri Prakash Vidya Niketan in Tuni, Andhra Pradesh.

References

External links 
 

1997 births
Living people
Indian female chess players
Chess woman grandmasters
Sportswomen from Andhra Pradesh
People from East Godavari district
21st-century Indian women
21st-century Indian people